32nd Artios Awards, presented by the Casting Society of America, honoring the best originality, creativity and the contribution of casting to the overall quality of a film, television, theatre and short-form projects, was held on January 19, 2017, in simultaneous ceremonies at the Beverly Hilton Hotel, Los Angeles and Stage 48 in New York City. The New York City ceremony was hosted by Michael Urie, while Joel McHale hosted the Los Angeles ceremony.

The television and theatre nominations were announced on September 27, 2016. The film nominations were announced on January 3, 2017.

Winners and nominees
Winners are listed first and highlighted in boldface:

Film
{| class=wikitable
|-
| valign="top" width="50%"|
''La La Land – Deborah Aquila, Tricia WoodDeadpool – Ronna Kress; Location Casting: Jennifer Page, Corinne Clark
Hail, Caesar! – Ellen Chenoweth; Associate: Susanne Scheel
Rules Don't Apply – David Rubin; Associate: Melissa Pryor
Whiskey Tango Foxtrot – Bernard Telsey, Tiffany Little Canfield; Location Casting: Jo Edna Boldin; Associate: Conrad Woolfe, Marie A.K. McMaster
|valign="top" width="50%"|Hidden Figures – Victoria Thomas; Location Casting: Jackie Burch; Associate: Bonnie GrisanArrival – Francine Maisler; Location Casting: Lucie Robitaille
Fantastic Beasts and Where to Find Them – Fiona Weir; Location Casting: Jim Carnahan
The Girl on the Train – Kerry Barden, Paul Schnee; Associate: Joey Montenarello, Adam Richards
Nocturnal Animals – Francine Maisler
|-
| valign="top" width="50%"|Hell or High Water – Richard Hicks, Jo Edna Boldin; Associate: Chris Redondo, Marie A.K. McMaster20th Century Women – Laura Rosenthal, Mark Bennett
Bad Moms – Cathy Sandrich Gelfond; Location Casting: Meagan Lewis
Café Society – Juliet Taylor, Patricia DiCerto; Associate: Meghan Rafferty
The Edge of Seventeen –  Melissa Kostenbauder; Location Casting: Coreen Mayrs, Heike Brandstatter
| valign="top" width="50%"|Manchester by the Sea – Douglas Aibel; Location Casting: Carolyn Pickman; Associate: Henry Russell BergsteinCaptain Fantastic – Jeanne McCarthy; Location Casting: Angelique Midthunder, Amey Rene
Jackie – Mary Vernieu, Lindsay Graham; Location Casting: Jessica Kelly
Lion – Kirsty McGregor
Loving – Francine Maisler; Location Casting: Erica Arvold, Anne N. Chapman; Associate: Michelle Kelly
|-
| valign="top" width="50%"|Moonlight – Yesi RamirezChristine – Douglas Aibel, Stephanie Holbrook; Location Casting: Tracy Kilpatrick; Associate: Blair Foster
Goat – Susan Shopmaker; Location Casting: D. Lynn Meyers
Hello, My Name Is Doris – Sunday Boling, Meg Morman
White Girl – Jessica Daniels
| valign="top" width="50%"|Moana – Jamie Sparer Roberts; Location Casting: Rachel SuttonFinding Dory – Kevin Reher, Natalie LyonThe Jungle Book – Sarah Halley Finn; Associate: Tamara HunterThe Little Prince – Sarah Halley Finn; Associate: Tamara HunterZootopia'' – Jamie Sparer Roberts
|-
|}

Television

Short-Form Projects

Theatre

Hoyt Bowers AwardNina GoldLynn Stalmaster Career Achievement AwardAnnette BeningMarion Dougherty New York Apple AwardThe Public Theater'''

References

Artios
Artios
Artios
January 2017 events in the United States
2017 in New York City
2017 in Los Angeles
Artios Awards